Carl Bryant Daniels (born August 26, 1970 in St. Louis, Missouri), is an American professional boxer in the Light Middleweight (154lb) division. He held the WBA Light Middleweight title in 1995.

Amateur 
Southpaw Daniels won the junior world championships 1987 and the Golden Gloves at flyweight.
He was a US feather champ in 1988 and beat Kevin Kelley in the Olympic trials. His record: 170-7.

Pro 
Daniels, nicknamed "The Squirrel", turned pro in 1988 and in 1992 landed a shot at the WBC Light Middleweight Title against Terry Norris. Norris won via TKO. In 1995, he fought Julio César Green for the Vacant WBA Light Middleweight Title and won a decision. In his first defense, he lost the title to Julio César Vásquez via 11th round TKO. Daniels was leading on the scorecards until the knockout happened; it ranked as Ring Magazine's Knockout Of The Year. In 1997 he got a chance to reclaim the belt against Laurent Boudouani, but lost a decision. It wasn't until 2002 that he got a shot at another major belt, taking on Bernard Hopkins and losing in a 10th round TKO. As of 2008, Daniels continues to fight after 18 years as a pro.

Professional boxing record

See also
List of world light-middleweight boxing champions

References

External links

|-

1970 births
Living people
American male boxers
African-American boxers
Boxers from St. Louis
Light-middleweight boxers
Middleweight boxers
Super-middleweight boxers
National Golden Gloves champions
Winners of the United States Championship for amateur boxers
World light-middleweight boxing champions
World Boxing Association champions